Georgi Keranov (1 April 1922 – 16 August 1988) was a Bulgarian sports shooter. He competed in the 25 m pistol event at the 1952 Summer Olympics.

References

1922 births
1988 deaths
Bulgarian male sport shooters
Olympic shooters of Bulgaria
Shooters at the 1952 Summer Olympics
People from Dobrich Province
20th-century Bulgarian people